James Solomon Russell (December 20, 1857 – March 28, 1935), born enslaved, in Mecklenburg County, Virginia, shortly before the American Civil War, became an Episcopal priest and educator. Russell founded Saint Paul Normal and Industrial School, which later became Saint Paul's College, and declined two elections to become bishop to continue directing that (now-closed) historically black college.

Early and family life
James Russell was born to Araminta, an enslaved woman on the Hendrick plantation in Mecklenburg County. His enslaved father, Solomon Russell, worked on the Russell plantation in Warren County, North Carolina. After the Union victory in the American Civil War, he rejoined the family and began sharecropping in Palmer Springs, Virginia. James began attending a local school whose schoolmaster allowed tuition to be paid in labor and farm products, and the schoolmaster and superintendent encouraged him to continue his education.

He thus was admitted to the Hampton Normal and Agricultural Institute (later Hampton University in 1874. Financial constraints required that he support himself, as well as interrupt his own education several times. After a year, he began teaching near home, and also worked when the college was not in session. As part of his elementary school curriculum, Russell required students to recite the Apostles' Creed daily. This came to the attention of a local Episcopalian matron, who gave him a Book of Common Prayer, and Russell decided to become a member of that denomination.

Russell's mother had long dreamed of her son becoming a priest and encouraged his education and ministerial aspirations. Mrs. Pattie Buford of Lawrenceville, Virginia brought Russell's desire to become a priest to the attention of Bishop Francis McNeece Whittle, who sent a local priest to Hampton to investigate and secured Russell's admission to the newly created Bishop Payne Divinity School in Petersburg, Virginia in 1878.

There for four years, Russell studied and worked closely with Rev. Giles Cooke, a Confederate officer who was educating African Americans. Although Rev. Cook expelled the boy who became Rev. George Freeman Bragg, Russell became his protege, and he even asked that Russell ultimately preside at his own funeral (but he outlived Russell, so that duty was performed by Russell's son).

In December 1882, Russell married Virginia Michigan Morgan of Petersburg, and the couple eventually had five sons and three daughters.

Career

Bishop Whittle ordained Russell a deacon on March 9, 1882, and sent him as a missionary back to Mecklenburg County. He worked in Lawrenceville, Virginia, at first holding services for African Americans at the white Episcopal Church, St. Andrew's. The following year, the diocese authorized funds to build a church for his parishioners, as well as a horse to assist on his missionary travels. He was ordained as a priest in 1887.

In January 1883, Russell and his wife began teaching African Americans in a room at the tiny new church. In 1888, through a legacy of the Rev. Saul of Philadelphia, they were able to buy another building. Thus, Russell founded Saint Paul Normal and Industrial School. Due to his enthusiasm and aggressive fund-raising, it expanded its enrollment and curriculum.  He retired as Principal and Chaplain in 1929, nine years after his wife's death, and the college's trustees elected his son James Alvin Russell to succeed him.

Meanwhile, in 1893, Rev. Russell was named Archdeacon of the newly formed Diocese of Southern Virginia and charged with working among African Americans. As a result of his ministry, the number of African American churches in his diocese (the newly formed Diocese of Southern Virginia) had increased from none to 37, with more than 2000 communicants. He later became the first African American to be named to the Board of Missions of the Episcopal Church, and served in that capacity from 1923 to 1931. In 1917, Russell was elected as Suffragan Bishop of Arkansas, but declined the honor in order to continue his work at the school, as he did when notified of his election as Suffragan Bishop of North Carolina. As long anticipated, in 1919, the Diocese of Southwestern Virginia was created from the relatively new Diocese of Southern Virginia, and Lawrenceville became part of the new diocese.

In 1904, inspired by Booker T. Washington, Russell founded an annual farmer's conference. He urged African American farmers to stay out of debt and to vote, although Virginia's Constitution on 1902 instituted poll taxes and Jim Crow Laws had begun.

Archdeacon Russell was awarded an honorary degree from the Virginia Theological Seminary (the first African American thus honored) in 1917, and in 1922 an honorary doctorate in laws from Monrovia College. He was also named Knight Commander of the Humane Order of African Redemption by the President of Liberia. in 1929 he won the Harmon Award.

Death and legacy

James Solomon Russell died at the President's house in Lawrenceville on March 28, 1935, after an extended illness. He was buried at Saint Paul's cemetery. His son Rev. J. Alvin Russell continued to run the St. Paul College with his wife Nellie Pratt Russell (an incorporator of the Alpha Kappa Alpha sorority), and a board of trustees. His eldest daughter Araminta served as its registrar (800 students were enrolled the year of his death) until her death in 1937. Archdeacon Russell's autobiography, Adventure in Faith, was published in 1935. The historically black college developed financial problems after the successes of the American Civil Rights Movement. Accreditation problems in 2012 led to merger talks (which failed) so it closed in 2013.

In 1995, the Diocese of Southern Virginia added James Solomon Russell to its liturgical commemorations on the anniversary of his death, and that was later extended by the General Convention to the Episcopal Church. A middle school in Lawrenceville, Virginia, is also named after the pioneering educator and missionary.

References

1935 deaths
1857 births
People from Mecklenburg County, Virginia